Bryocoris is a genus of plant bugs belonging to the family Miridae.

The genus was first described by Fallén in 1829.

The species of this genus are found in Europe and Japan.

Species
These species belong to the genus Bryocoris:

 Bryocoris biquadrangulifer (Reuter, 1906)
 Bryocoris bui Hu & Zheng, 2000
 Bryocoris concavus Hu & Zheng, 2000
 Bryocoris convexicollis Hsiao, 1941
 Bryocoris flaviceps Zheng & Liu, 1992
 Bryocoris formosensis Linnaeus, 2003
 Bryocoris gracilis Linnavuori, 1962
 Bryocoris hsiaoi Zheng & Liu, 1992
 Bryocoris insuetus Hu & Zheng, 2000
 Bryocoris latiusculus Hu & Zheng, 2007
 Bryocoris latus Linnaeus, 2003
 Bryocoris lii Hu & Zheng, 2000
 Bryocoris lobatus Hu & Zheng, 2000
 Bryocoris montanus Kerzhner, 1972
 Bryocoris nitidus Hu & Zheng, 2004
 Bryocoris paravittatus Linnaeus, 2003
 Bryocoris persimilis Kerzhner, 1988
 Bryocoris pteridis (Fallén, 1807)
 Bryocoris sichuanensis Hu & Zheng, 2000
 Bryocoris vittatus Hu & Zheng, 2000
 Bryocoris xiongi Hu & Zheng, 2000

References

Miridae